Bombrana  is a village in Kasaragod district in the state of Kerala, India.

Demographics
As of 2011 India census, Bombrana village had total population of 6,473 which constitutes 3,057 males and 3,416 females. Population of children in the age group of 0-6 was 914 (14.1%) where 452 are boys and 462 are girls. 
Bombrana village had overall literacy rate of 88.8% where male literacy was 93.5% and female literacy was 84.6%.

References

Suburbs of Kasaragod